Richard Sakwa (born 1953) is a British political scientist and a former professor of Russian and European politics at the University of Kent, a senior research fellow at the National Research University-Higher School of Economics in Moscow, and an honorary professor in the Faculty of Political Science at Moscow State University. He has written books about Russian, Central and Eastern European communist and post-communist politics.

Career
Sakwa is Emeritus Professor of Russian and European politics at the University of Kent. From 2001 to 2007 he was also the head of the University's Politics and International Relations department. He has published on Soviet, Russian and post-communist affairs, and has written and edited several books and articles on the subject.

Sakwa was a participant of Valdai Discussion Club, an associate fellow of the Russia and Eurasia Programme at the Royal Institute of International Affairs, a member of the advisory boards of the Institute of Law and Public Policy in Moscow and a member of Academy of Learned Societies for the Social Sciences. He is a commentator for RT and has spoken at Stop The War Coalition events.

His book Frontline Ukraine is about the origins of the Russo-Ukrainian War. It argues that the conflicts in the post-Soviet space are caused by the expansionism of western/Atlanticist "Wider Europe" and the revanchist aggression of Eastern European states, with the USA and NATO sparking a new Cold War. The book cautions against European  security  becoming "hostage to  a faraway country", Ukraine. Sakwa argues that it is "wrong-headed in conceptualization and dangerous in its consequences" to describe Russia as expansionist: "Russia under Putin is not a land-grabbing state, it is a profoundly conservative power and its actions are designed to maintain the status  quo... [Russia]  makes  no  claim  to  revise  the  existing  international order, but to make it more inclusive and universal." Sakwa argues that Russia's wars with Georgia are defensive wars against NATO expansionism.

His 2021 book Deception argues that investigations into Russiagate – allegations that Donald Trump colluded with Russia to win the 2016 U.S. presidential election – were politically biased and based on unverified documents. He said the investigations polarised the U.S. and politicised the intelligence community, which greatly damaged the country and soured U.S.–Russia relations.

Reception 
Sakwa's 2015 book Frontline Ukraine has provoked much debate among scholars and popular commentators, praised by some while criticised by others for apparent leniency towards Russia. The book was well-received by philosopher/linguist Noam Chomsky, historian Paul Robinson  and political scientist Serhiy Kudelia. Taras Kuzio criticised Sakwa for what he saw as pro-Russian bias and lack of expertise on Ukraine, and has described him as a "pro-Putin scholar". Sarah Lain of the Royal United Services Institute describes Sakwa has essentially providing the Russian perspective on the Ukraine conflict. Paul D'Anieri describes it as "a polemical attack on Western policy... and a defense of Russia... Sakwa clearly sympathizes with Russia's position."

Michael Rochlitz, an associate fellow at the Higher School of Economics in Moscow, described Sakwa's 2020 book Putin Redux, which is about Vladimir Putin, as "detailed, balanced and sober".

Maria Lipman, a Russian journalist, wrote in Foreign Affairs that Sakwa's 2021 book Deception "is an exceptionally detailed and well-documented account of all the major episodes covered by the Trump-Russia probes".

Published works

Books
Deception: Russiagate and the New Cold War (Lexington Books, 2021)
The Putin Paradox, (I.B. Tauris, 2020) [ paperback]
Developments in Russian Politics, Ninth Edition, (Red Globe Press, 2018).
Russia Against the Rest: The Post-Cold War Crisis of World Order  (Cambridge University Press, 2017)
Frontline Ukraine: Crisis in the Borderlands (I B Tauris, 2015) 
The Crisis of Russian Democracy: The Dual State, Factionalism and the Medvedev Succession (Cambridge, Cambridge University Press, 2011). [ (hbk);  (pbk)]
Communism in Russia: An Interpretative Essay (Basingstoke, Palgrave Macmillan, 2010), pp. vii + 167. [ paperback]
Russian edition: Коммунизм в России: интерпретирующее эссе. — М.: РОССПЭН, 2011. — 160 с. — (История сталинизма). — .
The Quality of Freedom: Putin, Khodorkovsky and the Yukos Affair (Oxford, Oxford University Press, 2009), pp. 426. 
Putin: Russia’s Choice, fully revised and updated 2nd edn (London and New York, Routledge, 2008), pp. 388. [ (hbk);  (pbk);  (ebk)]
Russian Politics and Society, Fourth Edition, completely rewritten and reorganised (London and New York, Routledge, 2008), pp. 585. [ (hbk),  (pbk),  (ebk);  (hbk),  (pbk),  (ebk)]
Fifth Edition (2021).
Putin: El Elegido de Rusia (Madrid, Ediciones Folio, S.A., 2005). 
The Rise and Fall of the Soviet Union, in the Routledge Sources in History series, General Editor: David Welch, Professor of Modern History, UKC (London, Routledge, 1999), pp.xxi + 521. [ISBN (hbk) 0-415-12289; (pbk) 0-415-12290-2] A book of annotated documents charting the political and moral trajectory of communism in the USSR.
Postcommunism, in the series Concepts in the Social Sciences, General Editor Frank Parkin (Buckingham and Philadelphia, Open University Press, 1999), pp. 144. [ (hbk);  (pbk)] Translated into Portuguese as O Pós-comunismo (Lisbon, Instituto Piaget, 2001), pp. 203. . Spanish translation went to press in September 2004.
Soviet Politics in Perspective, Second fully reworked edition of Soviet Politics: An Introduction (London, Routledge, October 1998), pp. xiii + 355. [ (hbk);  (pbk)]
Gorbachev and His Reforms, 198590 (London, Philip Allan/Simon and Schuster, October 1990; Englewood Cliffs, NJ, Prentice Hall, February 1991), pp. xiv + 459. [0-86003-423-2 (hbk); 0-86003-723-1 (pbk)]
Soviet Politics: An Introduction (London and New York, Routledge, June 1989), pp. xvi + 356. [ (hbk);  (pbk)]
Soviet Communists in Power: A Study of Moscow During the Civil War, 1918–21 (London, Macmillan, July 1988; New York, St Martins, 1988), pp. xxii + 342. [0-333-39847-5]

References

External links

Emeritus Professor Richard Sakwa

Living people
Academics of the University of Kent
1953 births
Historians of Russia
Alumni of the University of Birmingham
British political scientists